Janice Maxwell is a former Scottish international lawn bowler.

Bowls career
In 1992 she won a gold medal in both the triples and the fours at the 1992 World Outdoor Bowls Championship in Ayr. She also won a bronze medal in the fours at the 1994 Commonwealth Games in Victoria with Betty Forsyth, Elizabeth Dickson and Dorothy Barr.

In 1993 she won the fours gold medal at the inaugural Atlantic Bowls Championships and four years later won a fours bronze at the Championships.

She also won the Scottish National Bowls Championships singles title in 1986 bowling for Castle Douglas, beating Annette Evans of Willow Bank BC 21-19 in the final, played at Stewarton BC.  Janice is a 27 times champion of her club.

References

Scottish female bowls players
Living people
Bowls World Champions
Date of birth missing (living people)
Year of birth missing (living people)
Commonwealth Games medallists in lawn bowls
Commonwealth Games bronze medallists for Scotland
Bowls players at the 1994 Commonwealth Games
Medallists at the 1994 Commonwealth Games